Operation Sleeping Bag (German: Unternehmen Schlafsack) is a 1955 West German comedy war film directed by Arthur Maria Rabenalt and starring Eva Ingeborg Scholz, Paul Klinger and Karlheinz Böhm.

It was shot at the Wandsbek Studios in Hamburg. The film's sets were designed by the art directors Albrecht Becker and Herbert Kirchhoff. It was distributed by the German branch of the Rank Organisation.

Plot
During the closing stages of the Second World War, a bureaucratic mistake leads to a German officer being reassigned from the dangerous Eastern Front to Berlin and a new non-existent unit.

Cast
Eva Ingeborg Scholz as Käthe Forbach 
Paul Klinger as Captain Brack 
Karlheinz Böhm as artillerist Gravenhorst 
Kurt Meisel as first lieutenant Taut 
Renate Mannhardt as Renate Kern 
Bum Krüger as Oberwachtmeister Kern 
Gisela Tantau as young Tänzerin Nica 
Oskar Sima as Oberstleutnant Quent 
Dorothea Wieck as Frau Gravenhorst
Ursula Herking as Ulla 
Beppo Brem as Unteroffizier Weidlinger 
Charles Regnier as Oberfeldrichter Dr. Kratz 
Ernst Waldow as lieutenant colonel König 
Kai Fischer as Sylvia, the actress 
Willi Rose as Klawitter, the doorman
Josef Dahmen as Major Fercher 
Jupp Hussels as captain
Franz Muxeneder as lance corporal Hallgruber 
Reinhold Nietschmann as Herr Prill 
Wolfgang Neuss as Captain Z. 
Horst Breitenfeld as lance corporal Borngräber 
Willy Millowitsch as sergeant Wiechert 
Götz von Langheim as first lieutenant Randolph 
Walter Klam as Captain Becker 
Adeline Wagner as Eva 
Helmut Peine as 1. officer in the OKH 
Carl Voscherau as 2. officer in the OKH 
Rudolf Fenner as 3. officer in the OKH 
Benno Sterzenbach as officer of the SS 
Lotte Klein as Frau Körber 
Aranka Jaenke as young woman
Kurt Fuß as hotel doorman 
Karl-Heinz Kreienbaum as lance corporal X 
Karl Fleischer as lance corporal Y 
Albert Florath as caretaker at the Music Academy
Friedrich Schütter as first lieutenant B

References

External links

1955 comedy films
1950s war comedy films
German war comedy films
West German films
Films directed by Arthur Maria Rabenalt
Real Film films
Films shot at Wandsbek Studios
German World War II films
Eastern Front of World War II films
Films set in Berlin
German black-and-white films
1950s German films
1950s German-language films